The Debolt Formation is a stratigraphical unit of Meramecian age in the Western Canadian Sedimentary Basin. 

It takes the name from the hamlet of Debolt, Alberta, and was first described in the Amerada Crown GF23-11 well near Debolt by G. Macauley in 1958.

Lithology
The Debolt Formation is commonly subdivided into a lower and upper unit.  Lower Debolt rocks are bioclastic limestones deposited on a stable carbonate ramp.  These lower Debolt rocks are rarely dolomitized and therefore have little porosity or commercial use.  Upper Debolt sedimentation is characterized by a number of shallowing upwards facies.  At the base of the Upper Debolt is distal and medial ramp argillaceous limestone facies with limited laminations and thin bedding.  These argillaceous facies rarely contain clean carbonate interbeds in the medial ramp setting, predominantly wackestones and packstones.  These facies are followed by a capping proximal ramp/shoal facies with abundant skeletal packstones and grainstones.

Distribution
The Debolt Formation is present in the sub-surface in the Peace River Country in northern Alberta and north-eastern British Columbia.

Relationship to other units
The Debolt Formation is the upper most component of the Rundle Group. It rests conformably on the Shunda Formation, resting on shale and carbonates. It is overlain conformably by the Golata Formation of the Stoddart Group in the west, and the upper contact becomes unconformable with gradually newer formations to the east and north (Permian, Triassic, Jurassic and Cretaceous beds).

References

Geologic formations of Alberta
Stratigraphy of British Columbia
Western Canadian Sedimentary Basin
Mississippian Series
Carboniferous Alberta
Carboniferous British Columbia
Carboniferous System of North America